The list of parties to the Biological Weapons Convention encompasses the states which have signed and ratified or acceded to the Biological Weapons Convention (BWC), a multilateral treaty outlawing biological weapons.

On 10 April 1972, the BWC was opened for signature. The Netherlands became the first state to deposit their signature of the treaty that same day. The treaty closed for signature upon coming into force on 26 March 1975 with the deposit of ratification by 22 states. Since then, states that did not sign the BWC can only accede to it.

A total of 197 states may become members of the BWC, including all 193 United Nations member states, the Cook Islands, the Holy See, the State of Palestine and Niue. As of February 2023, 185 states have ratified or acceded to the treaty, most recently South Sudan in February 2023. A further five states have signed but not ratified the treaty.

Several countries made reservations when ratifying the agreement declaring that it did not imply their complete satisfaction that the BWC allows the stockpiling of biological agents and toxins for "prophylactic, protective or other peaceful purposes", nor should it imply recognition of other countries they do not recognise.

States Parties
According to the treaties database maintained by the United Nations Office for Disarmament Affairs, as of February 2023, 185 states have ratified or acceded to the BWC. However, the status of the succession of a number of additional states to the BWC is unclear. For further details, see the Succession of colonies to the BWC section below.

Multiple dates indicate the different days in which states submitted their signature or deposition, varied by location. This location is noted by: (L) for London, (M) for Moscow, and (W) for Washington D.C.

Notes

State with limited recognition, abiding by treaty
When the PRC subsequently ratified the treaty, they described the ROC's ratification as "illegal". The ROC has committed itself to continue to adhere to the requirements of the treaty, and the United States has declared that they still consider them to be "bound by its obligations".

Signatory states
The following four states have signed, but not ratified the BWC.

Notes

Non-signatory states
The following 8 UN member states have neither signed nor ratified the BWC. 

Notes

Succession of colonies to the BWC
The status of several former dependent territories of a state party to the BWC, whose administrating power ratified the Convention on their behalf, with regards to the Convention following their independence is currently unclear.  According to the Vienna Convention on Succession of States in respect of Treaties (to which 22 states are party), "newly independent states" (a euphemism for former colonies) receive a "clean slate", such that the new state does not inherit the treaty obligations of the colonial power, but that they may join multilateral treaties to which their former colonizers were a party without the consent of the other parties in most circumstances.  Conversely, in "cases of separation of parts of a state" (a euphemism for all other new states), the new state remains bound by the treaty obligations of the state from which they separated.  To date, this Convention has only been ratified by 22 states.

The United Kingdom attached a territorial declaration to their instrument of ratification of the BWC in 1975 stating in part that it applied to:

This declaration bound the territories of Kiribati and Tuvalu to the terms of the Convention.  Following their independence, none of these states have made unambiguous declarations of succession to the BWC.  Dominica and Vanuatu's statuses were likewise ambiguous from their independence until 2016.

Kiribati
In 1979, Kiribati gained their independence and subsequently, the President of Kiribati sent a note to the UNSG stating that:

Since then, none of the depositaries for the BWC has received an instrument of accession or succession to the Convention from Kiribati.  However, the Government of Kiribati has made statements suggesting that it does not consider itself a party to the treaty.

Tuvalu
Following independence in 1978, the Prime Minister of Tuvalu sent a note to the UNSC stating that:

Since then, none of the depositaries for the BWC has received an instrument of accession or succession to the Convention from Tuvalu.  However, the Government of Tuvalu has made statements suggesting that it does not consider itself a party to the treaty.

Dominica

After becoming independent in 1978, the Prime Minister of Dominica sent a note to the Secretary-General of the United Nations (UNSG) stating that:

The Government of Dominica later stated that it did not consider itself bound by the Convention.  However, Dominica was listed as a state party to the BWC in documents from the Meetings of the States Parties to the BWC.  The UK Treaty Office (as depositary) did not receive an instrument of succession from Dominica until 2016.

Vanuatu
In 1980, the territory gained their independence.  Vanuatu was listed as a state party to the BWC in documents from the Meetings of the States Parties to the BWC, however the Government of Vanuatu made statements suggesting that it did not consider itself a party to the treaty and the UK depositary had no record of receiving an instrument of succession to the BWC from Vanuatu until 2016.

See also 

 List of parties to the Chemical Weapons Convention
 List of parties to the Convention on Certain Conventional Weapons
 List of parties to the Comprehensive Nuclear-Test-Ban Treaty
 List of parties to the Treaty on the Non-Proliferation of Nuclear Weapons
List of parties to the Treaty on the Prohibition of Nuclear Weapons
 List of parties to the Ottawa Treaty
 List of parties to the Partial Nuclear Test Ban Treaty
List of parties to weapons of mass destruction treaties

References

Arms control treaties
Biological warfare
Lists of parties to treaties